

Places 

Peyrat  may refer to the several places in France:
 Peyrat-de-Bellac, Haute-Vienne
 Peyrat-la-Nonière, Creuse
 Peyrat-le-Château, Haute-Vienne
 Le Peyrat, Ariège

Persons 
 Jacques Peyrat
 Napoléon Peyrat